Makhir ben Yehudah Zakkai of Narbonne or Makhir ben Habibai of Narbonne or Natronai ben Habibi (725 - 765 CE or 793 CE) was a Babylonian-Jewish scholar and later, the supposed leader of the Jewish community of Narbonne in a region which at that time was called Septimania at the end of the eighth century.

Writings by Abraham ibn Daud
According to a tradition preserved by Abraham ibn Daud in his Sefer ha-Qabbalah, written about 1161, Makhir was a descendant of the house of David. Ibn Daud wrote:

Then King Charles sent to the King of Baghdad [Caliph] requesting that he dispatch one of his Jews of the seed of royalty of the House of David. He hearkened and sent him one from there, a magnate and sage, Rabbi Makhir by name. And [Charles] settled him in Narbonne, the capital city, and planted him there, and gave him a great possession there at the time he captured it from the Ishmaelites [Arabs]. And he [Makhir] took to wife a woman from among the magnates of the town; *...* and the King made him a nobleman and designed, out of love for [Makhir], good statutes for the benefit of all the Jews dwelling in the city, as is written and sealed in a Latin charter; and the seal of the King therein [bears] his name Carolus; and it is in their possession at the present time. The Prince Makhir became chieftain there. He and his descendants were close [inter-related] with the King and all his descendants.

Whatever Makhir's Babylon origins claimed by his descendants, the relation between Makhir and Charlemagne is legendary, the more famous king substituting for his father Pepin, king of the Franks, who in order to enlist the Jews of Narbonne in his efforts to keep the Umayyad Saracens at bay, granted wide-ranging powers in return for the surrender of Moorish Narbonne to him in 759. The Annals of Aniane and the Chronicle of Moissac both attribute this action to the Gothic leaders of Narbonne, rising up and massacring the Saracen garrison. Pepin with his sons Carloman and Charles redeemed this pledge in 768, granting to Makhir and his heirs extensive lands, an act that called forth an unavailing protest from Pope Stephen III. In 791 Charlemagne confirmed the status of the Jewish Principate and made the title of Nasi permanent.

The Makhir family enjoyed for centuries many privileges and that its members bore the title of "nasi" (prince). Benjamin of Tudela, who visited Narbonne in 1165, speaks of the exalted position occupied by the descendants of Makhir, and the "Royal Letters" of 1364  also record the existence of a rex Iudaeorum (King of the Jews) at Narbonne. The place of residence of the Makhir family at Narbonne was designated in official documents as "Cortada Regis Judæorum".

Bnei Makhir and Carolingian dynasty

Arthur Zuckerman maintains that Makhir was actually identical with Natronai ben Habibi, an exilarch deposed and exiled in a dispute between two branches of the family of Bostanai in the late eighth century. Zuckerman further identified Makhir (Natronai) with a Maghario, Count of Narbonne (actually Viscount), and in turn with an Aymeri de Narbonne, who lived in the 12th century but whom heroic poetry makes father of William of Gellone (died 813). This William was subject of at least six major epic poems composed before the era of the Crusades, including Willehalm by Wolfram von Eschenbach, (who also, in another work, was a chronicler of the search of the Grail).

The historical William, i. e. William I, Count of Toulouse led Frankish forces at the fall of Barcelona in 803. The account of the campaign in Ermold Niger's Latin poem dates the events, as Zuckerman says, according to the Jewish calendar and portrays William, again according to Zuckerman's interpretation, as an observant Jew. Count William was actually the son of the Frankish Count Theoderic and in 806 became a monk. In another identification, Zuckerman concludes that Theoderic was none other than Makhir, and that the well-documented descendants of Theoderic embodied a dynasty of Franco-Judeic kings of Narbonne, representing the union of the lineage of the exilarchs with Carolingians.

However, this underlying chain of identifications has been shown to be flawed, a negative opinion shared by other scholars, while the broader suggestions of a Jewish principality in Southern France have likewise been disputed. Zuckerman's use of sources and analytical approach have also been criticized.

See also
Descent from antiquity
History of the Jews in France
Hachmei Provence
Resh Galuta

References

Bibliography
"Machir". Jewish Encyclopedia. Funk and Wagnalls, 1901-1906

8th-century Frankish rabbis
Jewish royalty
Clergy from Narbonne
Provençal Jews
725 births